was the twenty-third of the fifty-three stations of the Tōkaidō highway, which connected Edo with Kyoto in premodern Japan. It is located in what is now part of Shimada, Shizuoka Prefecture, Japan.

History
Shimada-juku was located on the left bank (Edo side) of the Ōi River, just across from its neighboring post town, Kanaya-juku. As part of the outer defenses of the capital of Edo, the Tokugawa shogunate expressly forbid the construction of any bridge or ferry service over the Ōi River, forcing travelers to wade across its shallows. However, whenever the river flooded due to strong or long rains, crossing the river became nearly impossible. During periods of long rains, visitors were sometimes forced to stay at Shimada-juku for several days, increasing the amount of money they spent.

The classic ukiyo-e print by Andō Hiroshige (Hōeidō edition) from 1831 to 1834 depicts travelers crossing the shallows and sand banks of the Ōi River. Some are on foot, some are carried by porters and others are riding in kago.

National Historic Site
The site of the post town is located approximately two kilometers west of present-day Shimada Station on the JR East Tokaido Main Line. Initially, the river crossing was under the jurisdiction of the daikan of Shimada-juku, but in 1696 the post was separated, and the river crossing came under the jurisdiction of a separate office. The procedure to cross the river was to have travelers purchase a crossing permit at the magistrate's office, and then be carried across the river either on the backs of porters or by kago palanquin. The fee for crossing the river was determined daily by measuring the width and depth of the channel. The number of people making the crossing each day was estimated at 350 in the early Edo period, growing to more than 650 by the end of the Tokugawa Shogunate. A portion of the post town, including a number of late Edo-period buildings, has been preserved as a historic neighborhood. The magistrate's office has been relocated from its original site due to construction of the modern highway, but the structure itself is in good preservation. This building, along with the banyado where people gathered to make the crossing, and the fudaba, where the wooden river crossing tickets were sold and recovered, were designated a National Historic Site in 1966.

Gallery

Neighboring post towns
Tōkaidō
Fujieda-juku - Shimada-juku - Kanaya-juku

Further reading
Carey, Patrick. Rediscovering the Old Tokaido:In the Footsteps of Hiroshige. Global Books UK (2000). 
Chiba, Reiko. Hiroshige's Tokaido in Prints and Poetry. Tuttle. (1982) 
Taganau, Jilly. The Tokaido Road: Travelling and Representation in Edo and Meiji Japan. RoutledgeCurzon (2004).

References

Stations of the Tōkaidō
Stations of the Tōkaidō in Shizuoka Prefecture
Historic Sites of Japan
Shimada, Shizuoka
History of Shizuoka Prefecture
Suruga Province